The Cauchois pigeon is a breed of fancy pigeon. Cauchois pigeons, along with other varieties of domesticated pigeons, are all descendants from the rock pigeon (Columba livia). It was also eaten in France.

See also 

List of pigeon breeds

Pigeon breeds

References